Benjamín Zarandona Esono (born 2 March 1976), known simply as Benjamín, is a former professional footballer who played as a midfielder. Born in Spain, he represented Equatorial Guinea at international level.

He spent most of his professional career in Spain, notably with Betis where he remained nine years, winning one Copa del Rey and appearing in 194 official games. Over 12 seasons, he amassed La Liga totals of 244 matches and 18 goals, also representing in the competition Valladolid and Cádiz.

Benjamín was a member of the Equatorial Guinea national team.

Club career

Valladolid
Born in Valladolid, Castile and León, Benjamín began his career with Real Valladolid, playing initially for the reserves in Segunda División B. His first-team debut took place on 2 April 1995 in a 0–3 away loss against Real Sociedad, and he made a further nine La Liga appearances during that season.

The highlight of Benjamín's career at Valladolid was helping the club qualify for the 1997–98 UEFA Cup as seventh in the league, scoring home braces against CD Logroñés (2–1) and Valencia CF (4–1).

Betis
In 1998, Benjamín joined Real Betis, playing in 28 games in his first year and making four appearances in the team's UEFA Cup run, netting twice. Additionally, he spent the 2000–01 campaign helping the Andalusians achieve promotion from Segunda División, alongside neighbours Sevilla FC.

After appearing in 26 league matches in 2004–05, as Betis achieved qualification honours to the UEFA Champions League and lifted the Copa del Rey, Benjamín went on loan to Cádiz CF for the 2005–06 season, and his role at the former would gradually lose importance onwards: he was unregistered for over a year, and a mutual termination of his contract was agreed in the summer of 2007.

Later years
Benjamín joined second-level side Xerez CD for 2007–08, but lasted only a few months, being released. In September 2008, he signed with CF Palencia from Tercera División, continuing to compete in amateur football until his retirement in June 2013.

International career
In 1998, Benjamín helped the Spanish under-21s win the UEFA European Under-21 Championship. However, in 2004, he switched allegiances and, as his younger brother Iván who also played for Valladolid, opted to represent Equatorial Guinea.

Personal life
Benjamín's father was Basque, and his mother was from Equatorial Guinea. Despite his Basque parentage, he was never approached by Athletic Bilbao nor did he play for Euskadi.

Honours
Betis
Copa del Rey: 2004–05

Spain U21
UEFA European Under-21 Championship: 1998

References

External links

Betisweb stats and bio 
Stats and bio at Cadistas1910 

1976 births
Living people
Spanish sportspeople of Equatoguinean descent
Spanish people of Basque descent
Citizens of Equatorial Guinea through descent
Equatoguinean sportspeople of Spanish descent
Equatoguinean people of Basque descent
Footballers from Valladolid
Spanish footballers
Equatoguinean footballers
Association football midfielders
La Liga players
Segunda División players
Segunda División B players
Tercera División players
Real Valladolid Promesas players
Real Valladolid players
Real Betis players
Cádiz CF players
Xerez CD footballers
CF Palencia footballers
Spain under-21 international footballers
Spain under-23 international footballers
Equatorial Guinea international footballers